is a Japanese former swimmer. She competed in the women's 100 metre freestyle at the 1956 Summer Olympics.

References

External links
 

1938 births
Living people
Olympic swimmers of Japan
Swimmers at the 1956 Summer Olympics
Place of birth missing (living people)
Asian Games medalists in swimming
Asian Games gold medalists for Japan
Swimmers at the 1958 Asian Games
Medalists at the 1958 Asian Games
Japanese female freestyle swimmers